Lewis Miller (born 24 August 2000) is an Australian professional soccer player who plays as a right back  for Hibernian.

Club career

Central Coast Mariners
In October 2019, Miller signed a scholarship contract with Central Coast Mariners, following a strong pre-season. 3 months later, in January 2020, he signed a two-year contract, upgrading him to a professional senior contract.

Hibernian
In June 2022 Miller signed a three-year contract for Scottish side Hibernian, effective from 1 July. He had been due to join Australian side Macarthur FC, having signed a pre-contract deal with them before the end of his contract at Central Coast Mariners, but then signed for Hibernian instead, netting Macarthur FC an undisclosed transfer fee.

International career
Miller was first called up to the Australian under-23 side in October 2021, for 2022 AFC U-23 Asian Cup qualification matches against Indonesia in Tajikistan. He made his debut for the side against Indonesia on 26 October 2021, winning a penalty in a 3–2 win.

Miller was subsequently called up to the team for the final 2022 AFC U-23 Asian Cup in June 2022.

References

External links

2000 births
Living people
Australian soccer players
Association football defenders
Central Coast Mariners FC players
A-League Men players
Hibernian F.C. players
Australian expatriate soccer players
Expatriate footballers in Scotland
Australian expatriate sportspeople in Scotland
Scottish Professional Football League players